David Charles Gower Hunt  (born 22 May 1934 in Woolwich, London) is an English sailor. He won a silver medal in the Tempest class with Alan Warren at the 1972 Summer Olympics.

References

External links
 
 
 

1934 births
Living people
People from Woolwich
English male sailors (sport)
Olympic sailors of Great Britain
Sailors at the 1972 Summer Olympics – Tempest
Sailors at the 1976 Summer Olympics – Tempest
Olympic silver medallists for Great Britain
Olympic medalists in sailing
Medalists at the 1972 Summer Olympics
Flying Dutchman class world champions
World champions in sailing for Great Britain